Al-Mouwasat Welfare Organization (AMWO) Pashto دالمواسات خیریه ټولنه is a Non-governmental organization in Afghanistan. Keeping in view the needs of Afghan people, some respected friends suggested to found an organization to help and fulfill the needs of Afghan nation in health and education sectors on priority basis. Al-Mouwasat was founded in January 2012 by Anwar ul Haq Mujahid. It is a non-profitable, charitable, independent and non-governmental organization registered with Ministry of Economy (Afghanistan), and dedicated to reduce human suffering. It has nothing to do with any regional, ethnic or political organization of Afghanistan.

Programs Or Services

Al-Mouwasat is sorting out among the problems which are serious and then offers  solution to it by proper allocation of fund. At the moment, AMWO is working in following fields:

 Health
 
 Education
 
 Social Awareness
 
 Poverty Alleviation
 
 Emergency Services
 
 Relief Works

Mission

AMWO want to serve Afghan nation, As Afghanistan lacks behind basic needs of everyday life. AMWO want to provide the basic facilities to the ordinary man of this War-Torn country.

Philosophy

AMWO is Afghan analysis for Afghan problems through Afghan solutions by the help of community stake holders. AMWO want to be the part of solutions to our national problems through welfare setup.

Major Project

AMWO has launched the first ever free ambulance service in Afghanistan in November 2012, initially the service was only available in Nangarhar province, but now its available for more than five provinces. And step wise it will widen to entire Afghanistan. This is the first of its kind, in any kind of emergency you can avail state of the art services for free. This service will help many Afghans as there is no such well managed emergency ambulance service in Afghanistan.

Upcoming Project

After success of free ambulance service, AMWO decided to work on a Thalassemia center in order to facilitate the Thalassemia patients within the country with modern equipment and best personnel. According to reports, Afghanistan is among the Thalassemia affected countries, due to lack of basic health infrastructure patient are going to side by countries for treatment of Thalassemia.

Sources

AMWO has appointed their representatives in different countries e.g. United States of America, United Kingdom, Norway, France, Kingdom of Saudi Arabia and United Arab Emirates. These representatives are also their regional heads who use different approaches for fund-raising and spreading awareness about AMWO operations.

External links 
 Facebook Official Page

Non-profit organisations based in Afghanistan